Çevreli is a village in Tarsus district of Mersin Province, Turkey. It is situated in Çukurova (Cilicia of antiquity) to the north of Berdan River and Berdan Dam reservoir. The population of the village was 247 as of 2011. The main agricultural product of the village is grape.

References

Villages in Tarsus District